A number of motor vessels have been named Artemis, including:

, a bulk carrier
, a cruise ship

See also
 for steamships named Artemis

Ship names